Tuymazy (Tuymazı) is a town in the Republic of Bashkortostan, Russia, located  from Ufa. Population:  It is an industrial town, with petroleum and natural gas industries and mechanical engineering being the most important economic assets.

History
It was founded in 1912 as a railway station and was granted town status in 1960.

Administrative and municipal status
Within the framework of administrative divisions, Tuymazy serves as the administrative center of Tuymazinsky District, even though it is not a part of it. As an administrative division, it is incorporated separately as the town of republic significance of Tuymazy—an administrative unit with the status equal to that of the districts. As a municipal division, the town of republic significance of Tuymazy is incorporated within Tuymazinsky Municipal District as Tuymazy Urban Settlement.

Demographics
According to the 2002 Census, ethnic composition of the town was:
Tatars: 44.6%
Bashkirs: 25.3%
Russians: 27.7%
other ethnicities include the Chuvash people, the Mari people, Ukrainians, and others

References

Notes

Sources

External links
Official website of the Tuymazy Pedagogical College

1912 establishments in the Russian Empire
Cities and towns in Bashkortostan
Populated places established in 1912